Colin Ferguson (born July 22, 1972) is a Canadian-American actor, director and producer. He is known for playing Sheriff Jack Carter on the Syfy series Eureka, the Maytag Man, and Lewis on Then Came You.

Early life
Ferguson was born and raised in Montreal, Quebec, and is a graduate of Appleby College and McGill University. Since he was born and raised around Montreal, which predominantly speaks French, he is bilingual speaking both French and English. He was born in Canada and became a naturalized citizen of the United States.

Career
Ferguson was a member of the Montreal improv group On the Spot. He has been cast in many television series, television films, and films. In 2003, he starred in the short-lived TV show Coupling. He was the lead in Eureka, a Syfy original series broadcast between 2006 and 2012, for which he was also a producer in its later seasons. He was also a guest presenter for sci-fi news show HypaSpace.

He played the role of Burke Andrew in the 1993 TV mini series More Tales of the City, based on Armistead Maupin’s series of novels. 

In 2007, he starred as Dan Casey in the Lifetime Christmas film Christmas in Paradise alongside Charlotte Ross. In 2010, Ferguson starred as Nathan Bickerman in the syfy original film Lake Placid 3 co-starring Kirsty Mitchell. On September 5, 2011, he appeared on the podcast Disasterpiece Theatre to discuss what Eureka might have looked like if it had been directed by Michael Bay.

He starred in The Vampire Diaries and had a recurring role in TV series Haven in 2013 and 2014. In January 2014, Ferguson became the newest "Maytag Man" where he plays the role of the appliance in the latest Maytag ad campaign. In July 2015, Ferguson began playing a recurring role in season three of the Hallmark Channel series Cedar Cove, as the new district attorney and a rival to Jack.

In 2016, he starred as Jack Brewster in the Hallmark original film Every Christmas Has a Story alongside Lori Loughlin. Since 2017, he has starred as Mackintyre Sullivan in the Fixer Upper Mysteries alongside Jewel Kilcher.

Personal life
Ferguson has one son, born in 2013, whom he raises with partner Lindsay Thompson.

He is a Montreal Canadiens fan, and he contributes to NHL.com as a celebrity blogger.

Filmography

Film

Television

As a director or producer

Notes

External links
 
 

1972 births
20th-century Canadian male actors
21st-century Canadian male actors
American male television actors
American television directors
American television producers
Anglophone Quebec people
Appleby College alumni
Canadian emigrants to the United States
Canadian male television actors
Living people
Male actors from Montreal
McGill University alumni
Naturalized citizens of the United States